Worth may refer to:

Places
In the United States:
Worth, Georgia
Worth County, Georgia
Worth, Illinois
Worth Township, Cook County, Illinois
Worth Township, Woodford County, Illinois
Worth Township, Indiana
Worth Township, Michigan
Worth, Missouri
Worth County, Missouri
Worth County, Iowa
Worth, New York
Worth Township, Butler County, Pennsylvania
Worth Township, Centre County, Pennsylvania
Worth Township, Mercer County, Pennsylvania

In the United Kingdom:
Worth, Kent, in Dover district
Worth, West Sussex, a civil parish in West Sussex
Worth village, West Sussex, a village in Crawley
Worth Matravers or short Worth in Dorset

In Germany:
Worth, Schleswig-Holstein

People
Adam Worth (1844–1902), German-born American bank robber and mob boss
Amy Aldrich Worth (1888–1967), American composer
Billie Worth (1916–2016), American stage actress
Bobby Worth (1912–2002), American songwriter
Brendan Worth, Australian rugby league player
Brian Worth (actor) (1914–1978), British actor
Charles Frederick Worth (1825–1895), an English-born fashion designer of the 19th century
George Worth (1915–2006), American fencer
H M Worth, discoverer of Worth syndrome genetic disorder
Harry Worth (1917–1989), British comedy actor
Helen Worth (born 1951), British actress
Irene Worth (1916–2002), American actress
Jacob Worth (1838–1905), New York politician
Jonathan Worth (1802–1869), American politician
Marc Worth, British businessman
Marvin Worth (1925–1998), American film producer
Michael Worth, American actor
Nicholas Worth (1937–2007), American actor
Richard Worth, New Zealand politician
Sandra Worth, Canadian author
Valerie Worth (1933–1994), American poet
William Worth (1677−1742), Cornish classical scholar
William J. Worth (1794–1849), American General
William S. Worth (1840–1904), American General

Other uses
Net worth
Bobs Worth, an Irish racehorse
Worth (horse), an American Thoroughbred racehorse
Worth (magazine)
Worth1000, a website
Worth syndrome, genetic disorder
Worth, an album released in 1991 by Anything Box 
Worth School, an independent school in Turners Hill, England, United Kingdom
River Worth in Yorkshire, England, United Kingdom
Worth Valley (dale), the valley of the River Worth
Worth Valley, a council ward of Bradford, West Yorkshire
Worth (film), a 2020 biographical film
Worth (The Walking Dead), an episode of the television series The Walking Dead

See also
Wœrth
Wörth (disambiguation)
Fort Worth (disambiguation)